Rory Hugh Culkin (born July 21, 1989) is an American actor who is known for his roles in Scream 4, Lords of Chaos, You Can Count on Me, Columbus, and M. Night Shyamalan's Signs. He is the younger brother of actors Macaulay Culkin and Kieran Culkin.

Early life
Rory Hugh Culkin was born July 21, 1989 in New York City, the youngest of seven children born to Christopher Cornelius "Kit" Culkin, a former Broadway stage actor, and Patricia Brentrup, a native of North Dakota who met Kit in 1974 while working as a road traffic controller in Sundance, Wyoming. Culkin's siblings include Shane ( 1976), Dakota (1979–2008), Macaulay ( 1980), Kieran ( 1982), Quinn ( 1984), and Christian ( 1987). He also had a paternal half-sister, Jennifer (born 1970), who died in 2000. Culkin's paternal aunt is actress Bonnie Bedelia.

Career
Culkin began acting by playing alongside his elder brothers, among them Macaulay and Kieran, often as the younger versions of their characters. He first appeared in a photograph as a baby in The Good Son, then as Young Richie in Ri¢hie Ri¢h (Richie being played by his brother Macaulay) and in 2002, played 10-year-old Igby in Igby Goes Down (17-year-old Igby was played by his older brother Kieran).

Culkin's breakthrough role was in You Can Count on Me, opposite Laura Linney, a role for which he received much praise and a Young Artist Award. Since then, Culkin has appeared in numerous films, Signs being the most famous, in which he starred alongside Mel Gibson and Joaquin Phoenix.

As a teenager, Rory started moving into more independent films, such as The Chumscrubber, Hick and Down in the Valley.  He took a leading role in Mean Creek, a 2004 independent film about a group of teenagers that plan revenge on a bully. The entire youth cast won an Independent Spirit Award for this film.

Since his Young Artist Award win for You Can Count on Me, Culkin has received three more nominations. He had a guest role in the Law & Order: Special Victims Unit episode "Manic", and in the episode "Azoth the Avenger Is a Friend of Mine" of The Twilight Zone alongside Patrick Warburton. In May 2010, Culkin was cast for the slasher film Scream 4, which was released on April 15, 2011. Culkin was cast as Euronymous in the biographical film Lords of Chaos which tells the story about the events of the Norwegian black metal scene and the band Mayhem.

Personal life 
In 2018, Culkin married cinematographer Sarah Scrivener in New Orleans, Louisiana. The wedding was officiated by Paul Heyman on the eve of WrestleMania 34.

Filmography

Film

Television

References

External links

1989 births
Living people
20th-century American male actors
21st-century American male actors
American male child actors
American male film actors
American male television actors
American male voice actors
American people of Irish descent